Franz Albert Nürnberger II (1854–1931) is regarded as one of the greatest German bow makers.

He was trained in bowmaking by his father Franz Albert I (1826–1894), son of Karl Gottlieb, in Markneukirchen. Albert Nürnberger established his own shop around 1880. 

He trained his son, Carl Albert (1885–1971), who also used his brand.
Unfortunately the  later workshop bows also used the same brand. 

Before World War I (and after as well, until death of Albert II in 1931) Nürnberger and W. E. Hill & Sons were of the same competing standard, the best workshops in the world.

His bows are highly sought after. Original "Albert Nürnberger" bows, made before 1931 are rarer, of a higher standard and highly priced. 

"He is known to have exported bows to the US, where the Wurlitzer shop represented him as "the greatest modern bow maker" (c. 1912).

Eugène Ysaÿe, Jan Kubelik, Fritz Kreisler and later David Oistrakh used these bows and considered them equal to bows by the old masters. Of course they all had more than one  good bow in their collection(s)." Gennady Filimonov (2007)

References

 Die Geigen und Lautenmacher -  by Lutgendorff, Frankfurt 1922
Encyclopedia of the Violin - Alberto  Bachmann
 
 
 
Deutsche Bogenmacher-German Bow Makers  Klaus Grunke, Hans Karl Schmidt, Wolfgang Zunterer 2000

External links
1  All about Bows
2 *Albert Nürnberger* bow

1854 births
1931 deaths
Bow makers
German luthiers
People from Markneukirchen